Russell Lee Shaw, Jr. (born February 25, 1976) is a former American football wide receiver and defensive back who played for the Los Angeles Avengers and Chicago Rush in the Arena Football League.  He attended the University of Michigan.

References

1976 births
Living people
American football defensive backs
American football wide receivers
Chicago Rush players
Los Angeles Avengers players
Michigan Wolverines football players
Players of American football from Los Angeles